Carll Cneut (born 8 January 1969) is a Flemish illustrator. He has illustrated many books by Dutch and Flemish authors and he has received numerous awards for his work.

Early life 

Cneut studied graphic design at the Sint-Lucas School in Ghent, Belgium.

Career 

Cneut made his debut with his illustrations in the poetry collection Varkentjes van marsepein written by Geert De Kockere.

He won the Boekenpauw award twice: in 2000 for illustrating the book Willy written by Geert De Kockere and in 2004 for illustrating the book Mijnheer Ferdinand written by Agnes Guldemont.

In 2002, he published the book Het ongelooflijke liefdesverhaal van Heer Morf which he wrote as well as illustrated. In 2003, he won the Eselsohr award, the Zilveren Penseel and the Prix d'Illustration Jeunesse for this book. At the Biennial of Illustration Bratislava he won a Golden Plaque in 2003 for the illustrations this book as well as the illustrations in the book Mijnheer Ferdinand, written by Agnes Guldemont. He also won this award in 2005 for the book Dulle Griet.

In 2009, he won the Woutertje Pieterse Prijs together with Peter Verhelst for the book Het geheim van de keel van de nachtegaal, an adaptation of The Nightingale by Hans Christian Andersen. He also received the Boekenpluim award for this book. Verhelst won the Gouden Griffel award for this book as well as a Boekenwelp.

In 2015, he won the Boekenpluim award for illustrating the book De gouden kooi written by Anna Castagnoli.

Cneut has illustrated books by many authors over the years, including Edward van de Vendel, Ed Franck, Carl Norac and Brigitte Minne. He has also created illustrations for The New York Times. Much of his work has been published by De Eenhoorn.

Awards 
 2000: Boekenpauw, Willy (written by Geert De Kockere)
 2000: White Raven Award, Heksenfee
 2001: Bologna Ragazzi Award Special Mention, Woeste Mie
 2002: Boekenpluim, Roodgeelzwartwit
 2002: Prix Octogones, Roodgeelzwartwit
 2003: Eselsohr, Het ongelooflijke liefdesverhaal van Heer Morf
 2003: Zilveren Penseel, Het ongelooflijke liefdesverhaal van Heer Morf
 2003: Prix d'Illustration Jeunesse, Het ongelooflijke liefdesverhaal van Heer Morf
 2003: Golden Plaque Bratislava, Het ongelooflijke liefdesverhaal van Heer Morf and Mijnheer Ferdinand
 2004: White Raven Award, Mijnheer Ferdinand
 2004: Boekenpauw, Mijnheer Ferdinand (written by Agnes Guldemont)
 2005: Golden Plaque Bratislava, Dulle Griet
 2007: Picturale Prestige Prijs, Eén miljoen vlinders
 2009: Woutertje Pieterse Prijs, Het geheim van de keel van de nachtegaal (with Peter Verhelst)
 2009: Boekenpluim, Het geheim van de keel van de nachtegaal
 2009: White Raven Award Special Mention, Het geheim van de keel van de nachtegaal
 2009: Plantin-Moretus Publieksprijs, Het geheim van de keel van de nachtegaal
 2010: Boekenpluim, Fluit zoals je bent
 2010: Zilveren Penseel, Fluit zoals je bent
 2015: Boekenpluim, De gouden kooi
 2017: Prijs Letterkunde van de Provincie West-Vlaanderen, De gouden kooi

References

External links 

 Carll Cneut (in Dutch), Digital Library for Dutch Literature
 Carll Cneut (in Dutch), jeugdliteratuur.org

1969 births
Living people
Woutertje Pieterse Prize winners
Belgian children's book illustrators
Boekenpauw winners
People from Roeselare
21st-century Belgian people